Forgotten is a 2017 South Korean psychological thriller film written and directed by Jang Hang-jun. The film stars Kang Ha-neul and Kim Mu-yeol, with Moon Sung-keun and Na Young-hee in supporting roles.

Plot
Jin-seok, a young man, moves to a new house with his mother, father, and older brother Yoo-seok. Things seem off to Jin-seok in their new home. One rainy night he witnesses Yoo-seok being kidnapped and dragged into a car. Nineteen days pass and suddenly, Yoo-seok returns. Jin starts noticing discrepancies in his family's personality. He then realizes that they are not his family at all, but people pretending to be his family. He escapes the house and goes to the police. When he tells them he is 21 years old, the skeptical officer asks him what year it is. He replies that it's 1997; the officer reveals that it is actually 2017. Jin is, in fact, 41 years old.

A shocked Jin looks around and sees signs of modern life: a tablet, a smartphone; a LED flat-screen TV showing the current South Korean President Moon Jae-in and United States President Donald Trump. He leaves confused, but is captured by the same "family" that was holding him captive. The young man pretending to be his brother, "Yoo-seok," tells Jin that twenty years ago, a teenage girl and her mother were murdered. The case went cold, so the family of the victims hired "Yoo-seok" to find the murderer which is Jin. In flashbacks, it is shown that Jin was abducted and tortured to confess, but maintained his innocence. A psychiatrist suggested that he had repressed his memory because the event was too traumatic. The team has the psychiatrist hypnotize him back to his last happy memory in 1997, figuring that if they could re-enact the events of the murder, Jin might be able to recover his memories and tell them what happened. Everything was going as planned, until the night when Jin saw Yoo-seok being kidnapped. He was actually being arrested for fraud, and was gone for 19 days because they needed to wait until the next rainy night to properly re-enact the night of the murder. Back in the present, Jin escapes the van and the young man crashes, while Jin is struck by a stranger's car, resulting in him regaining his memories from 1997.

In 1997, the opening scene from the film is shown, except this time, Jin is with his actual parents and older brother, Yoo-seok. They get into a car accident that kills his parents and mortally injures his brother. Jin desperately needs money for Yoo-seok's surgery, but times are hard, due to the 1997 Asian financial crisis. He goes online seeking a job, and is messaged by an anonymous person, telling Jin he will pay him to kill someone's wife, but he must leave the two children unharmed. Arriving at the house, Jin's conscience doesn't allow him to go through with it. He is about to leave when the mother sees him, then the daughter, who starts screaming, and Jin ends up killing them both. The youngest child, a little boy, comes out, and Jin tells him to go back to bed. As he leaves, he discovers that this is actually the family of his brother's doctor.

Jin meets with the anonymous man, who is indeed Yoo-seok's doctor, demanding to know why the man would have his own family killed. The doctor explains that the financial crisis had bankrupted him; he had taken out multiple insurance policies on his wife to prevent his children from becoming homeless. Since Jin not only killed his wife but also his daughter, the doctor says Yoo-seok will die as well. A struggle ensues and the doctor is accidentally pushed to his death.

In the present, Jin wakes up in a hospital. The young man who had pulled Jin into the van survived the crash, and was now about to poison him to death, but Jin informs him that his memory has returned. The young man reveals that he was the little boy in the house twenty years ago, whom Jin spared after killing his mother and sister. After the deaths of his parents and sister, his relatives took all the money and left him to grow up in an orphanage. He begs Jin to tell him why he hadn't killed him too, and whether the murders were planned by his father. A distraught Jin lies by taking full responsibility, but the young man doesn't believe him.

Jin, now aware that he had in fact committed the murders, poisons himself with the poisonous needle and dies; simultaneously, the young man comes to terms with the murder of his family, jumps out of a hospital window and plunges to his death.

The film flashes back to 1997. Jin's family is at the lake. His mother shouts out that the car is fixed now, implying someone was just working on it. Jin is stopped by a little boy, who offers him a lollipop. After being politely declined, the boy runs to his family. It is shown that it was the doctor and his family. The front of the doctor’s jacket appears slightly dirty, as if he was just working on a car. They all walk away happily. Jin is oblivious of things to come.

Cast
Kang Ha-neul as Jin-seok
Kim Mu-yeol as Yoo-seok
Moon Sung-keun as The Father
Na Young-hee as The Mother
Choi Go as Choi Seung-uk
Kim Hyun-mok as a student at police station
Yoo In-soo as High school student	
Lee Dong-jin
Lee Sung-woo
Yeon Je-hyung

Production 
Principal photography began on March 11, 2017 and ended on June 8, 2017. For the film's premise, Jang Hang-jun took inspiration from a story told to him by a friend, who recalled how his cousin left home for about a month and seemed liked a radically different person when he returned. Jang also drew inspiration from French folktale Bluebeard.

Release 
The film was released in South Korea on November 29, 2017.
 
After the local release, Forgotten was released on Netflix and available to 190 countries.

References

External links
 
 
 
 

2017 films
2010s mystery thriller films
South Korean mystery thriller films
South Korean psychological thriller films
2010s South Korean films